The Agricultural Stabilization and Conservation Service (ASCS) was an agency of the United States Department of Agriculture. It administered programs concerning farm products and agricultural conservation. It granted loans to farmers; purchased farm products from farmers and processors; administered land allotment and marketing quota programs; shared the cost of resource conservation and environmental protection measures with farmers and ranchers; and supervised civil defense activities relating to food. It also managed the inventories of the Commodity Credit Corporation. The ASCS was established in 1961.

In 1994, the ASCS was merged with other Agriculture agencies to create the Farm Service Agency.

References
World Book encyclopedia 1988
 

United States Department of Agriculture agencies
Defunct agencies of the United States government
Government agencies established in 1961